Smasher is the name of multiple different fictional characters appearing in American comic books published by Marvel Comics.

Publication history
Smasher first appeared in X-Men #107 (October 1977-February 1978), and was created by Chris Claremont and Dave Cockrum.

A new Smasher, named Isabel Kane, appears as a member of the Avengers in the Marvel NOW! relaunch. Her name was originally given as "Isabel Dare", but the collected edition of her first appearance said her surname was "Kane". According to editor Tom Brevoort, this change was deliberate; he even stated that "Dare was a mistake in the first place," as the character was intended to be Captain Terror's granddaughter from her first appearance.

Yet more Smashers, operating directly under Imperial control, appear in the 'Infinity' crossover.

Fictional character biography
The title of Smasher has been used by three different humanoid aliens who served in the Shi'ar Imperial Guard.

Vril Rokk

The first Smasher was Vril Rokk, who had a long, distinguished service with the Guard. He was also romantically linked with fellow Guardsman Plutonia.

In Untold Tales of Captain Marvel — which takes place before his first encounter with the X-Men — Smasher, the Guard, Marvel and the Kree all meet. A small division of the Guard, Deathbolt, Smasher, Fang and Oracle had been selected to guard the personage of Deathbird, the current ruler of the Shi'ar empire. They allied, then fought with the Kree after the latter came to their assistance against a murderous attack from the Skrulls. They later are involved with a confrontation against the Brood.

When Cassandra Nova was devastating the Shi'ar empire, Smasher was one of the few entities that managed to personally protect the empress Lilandra. Under protest, Smasher is ordered to travel to Earth to warn the X-Men about the threat Nova posed. He crash lands in a field full of cows. He does not make it to the mansion until well after the Imperial Guard, brainwashed by Nova, were attempting to kill the X-Men. His presence manages to convince the Guard to fight against Nova, although he and the others were swiftly defeated by her.

Smasher is later killed by Vulcan, a powerful mutant who attempts to conquer the Shi'ar empire.

Salac Tuur
Vril Rokk is soon replaced with another Smasher, Salac Tuur.  The new Smasher was among the Imperial Guardsmen who attacked the Kree homeworld during the wedding of Crystal and Ronan the Accuser. During the battle, Smasher was slain by the Inhuman Karnak.

Third Smasher
The uniform and title of Smasher was passed onto an unidentified member of the original's race; however, this version of Smasher was soon killed by Gladiator during a raid performed by Starjammers and Guardians of the Galaxy. The Strontian praetor killed Smasher as a sign of defecting to Lilandra.

Izzy Kane
A new Smasher appears in the Marvel NOW! relaunch as part of Captain America's new Avengers line-up. She joins the Avengers to help fight Ex Nihilo on Mars. She is revealed to be Isabel "Izzy" Kane, a college student and astronomer from Iowa. After finding a pair of high-tech goggles that had been left behind in a cornfield by Vril Rokk when he crashed to the Earth to warn the X-Men about Cassandra Nova, Izzy becomes the new Smasher and Earth's first member of the Imperial Guard. Izzy is introduced to Captain America by her grandfather Dan Kane, an acquaintance from World War II.

As part of the Avengers, Izzy meets the Guardians of the Galaxy when their ship is ambushed and crashes into a mall's parking lot.

When the source of mysterious seismic events was revealed to be A.I.M. Island, Smasher went to investigate along with Cannonball and Sunspot. When they arrived to the location, they were captured by A.I.M. Troopers. Smasher was chosen by Andrew Forson and Jude the Entropic Man to become his Messenger for the secret of the universe, that "Everything dies." Smasher is made to do so by Andrew Forson.

She is later seen eight months in the future as seen in the Time Runs Out storyline having started a family with teammate Sam Guthrie. She later rejoins with an Avengers team headed by Roberto DaCosta and Thor. Their goal is to find the threat causing the slow death of the multiverse and to kill it. This brings Smasher in direct opposition with Captain America's group.

Sometime later, Smasher is seen with Cannonball and their son on another planet discussing their future together, which leads to Cannonball deciding to quit the U.S.Avengers so that he could be with his family full time.

In the aftermath of the Secret Empire storyline, Smasher arrives on Earth and tells Sunspot that Cannonball, who was believed to be dead, is alive on another planet.

Monster
A new Smasher not affiliated with the Imperial Guard was introduced in Monsters Unleashed. This version is a creation of Kid Kaiju that is composed of him and his five monsters Slizzik, Hi-Vo, Aegis, Scragg and Mekara. They come together to battle the Leviathon Mother when the Leviathon Tide invaded Earth.

Powers and abilities
Like his predecessors, Smasher could naturally absorb cosmic radiation from his environment in order to increase his strength to superhuman levels.

Smasher wore special goggles called "exospex" that enabled him to "download" additional superhuman powers.  Via the exospex, he could obtain "penta-vision" (a form of X-ray vision), superhuman durability, even greater physical strength, and the ability to travel into hyperspace ("4-space"). Smasher was only capable of downloading one superpower at a time.

Smasher wore small anti-gravity "flight patches" that enabled him to fly. Flight patches are standard issue for Imperial Guardsmen who lack the power of flight.

Inspiration
Several of the members of the Imperial Guard are at least partly based on members of the DC Comics' team Legion of Super-Heroes. Dave Cockrum (co-creator of the Guard) also had a long run as artist on the Legion. Smasher is based on LSH member Ultra Boy.

Other versions

X-Men: The End
In the alternate future of X-Men: The End, Smasher is a veteran Guardian who is on duty when the plans of the series' main villain is revealed. He attacks with a small group of other Guardians. They are all slain, as a result, with Smasher's neck being snapped.

Star Trek/X-Men
Smasher also appears in Star Trek/X-Men #1 (December 1996). He and several other members of the Imperial Guard assist Deathbird in a mission.

In other media

Television
 The first Smasher appears in the X-Men episodes "The Dark Phoenix" and "Fate of the Phoenix." He and the Imperial Guard had to fight the X-Men to determine the fate of Jean Grey after the destructions that the Phoenix Force did to some of the galaxies.

References

External links
 
 
 

Articles about multiple fictional characters
Avengers (comics) characters
Characters created by Chris Claremont
Characters created by Dave Cockrum
Comics characters introduced in 1977
Marvel Comics aliens
Marvel Comics characters with superhuman strength
Marvel Comics extraterrestrial superheroes
Marvel Comics female superheroes
Marvel Comics male superheroes

fr:Liste des membres de la Garde impériale Shi'ar#Smasher